A can opener (in North American English and Australian English) or tin opener (used in British English) is a mechanical device used to open tin cans (metal cans). Although preservation of food using tin cans had been practiced since at least 1772 in the Netherlands, the first can openers were not patented until 1855 in England and 1858 in the United States. These early openers were basically variations of a knife, though the 1855 design continues to be produced. The first can opener, consisting of the now familiar sharp rotating cutting wheel that runs round the can's rim to cut open the lid, was invented in 1870, but was considered very difficult to operate for the ordinary consumer. A successful design came out in 1925 when a second, serrated wheel was added to hold the cutting wheel on the rim of the can. This easy-to-use design has become one of the most popular can opener models.

Around the time of World War II, several can openers were developed for military use, such as the American P-38 and P-51. These featured a robust and compact design with a pull cutting blade hinged to a corrugated handle with a pivot. Electric can openers were introduced in the late 1950s and met with success. The development of new can opener types continues with a recent redesign of a side-cutting model.

Invention of cans

Food preserved in tin cans was in use by the Dutch Navy from at least 1772. Before 1800, there was already a small industry of canned salmon in the Netherlands. Freshly caught salmon were cleaned, boiled in brine, smoked and placed in tin-plated iron boxes. This canned salmon was known outside the Netherlands, and in 1797 a British company supplied one of their clients with 13 cans. Preservation of food in tin cans was patented by Peter Durand in 1810. The patent was acquired in 1812 by Bryan Donkin, who soon set up the world's first canning factory in London in 1813.

By 1820, canned food was a recognised article in Britain and France and by 1822 in the United States. The first cans were robust containers, which weighed more than the food they contained and required ingenuity to open, using whatever tools available. The instruction on those cans read "Cut round the top near the outer edge with a chisel and hammer."  The gap of decades between the invention of the can and can opener may be attributed to the functionality of existing tools versus the cost and effort of a new tool.

Twist-key can-opener 

Also called Tin can key can-opener. During the 1800s, the canning process was mechanised and refined, with can walls becoming thinner. The twist-key can-opener was patented by J. Osterhoudt in 1866. There still was no general-purpose can-opener, thus each can came with a spot-welded or soldered-on twist-key can-opener which snapped off after fatiguing the metal by bending at a thin region. Each food-type had its own can-type, and came with its own can-opener-type. Tinned fish and meat were sold in rectangular cans. These cans were fitted with a twist-key that would roll around the top of the can, peeling back a pre-scored strip. Coffee, beans, and other types of meat were packaged in cylinders with metal strips that could be peeled back with their own kinds of built-in keys that would roll around the top of the can. Cans of milk used puncture devices.

Lever-type can openers

General-purpose can openers first appeared in the 1850s and had a primitive claw-shaped or "lever-type" design. In 1855, Robert Yeates, a cutlery and surgical instrument maker of Trafalgar Place West, Hackney Road, Middlesex, UK, devised the first claw-ended can opener with a hand-operated tool that haggled its way around the top of metal cans.

In 1858, another lever-type opener of a more complex shape was patented in the United States by Ezra Warner of Waterbury, Connecticut, US. It consisted of a sharp sickle, which was pushed into the can and sawed around its edge. A guard kept the sickle from penetrating too far into the can. The opener consisted of several parts which could be replaced if worn out, especially the sickle. This opener was adopted by the United States Army during the American Civil War (1861–1865); however, its unprotected knife-like sickle was too dangerous for domestic use. A home-use opener named the "Bull's head opener" was designed in 1865 and was supplied with cans of pickled beef named "Bully beef". The opener was made of cast iron and had a very similar construction to the Yeates opener, but featured a more artistic shape and was the first move towards improving the look of the can opener. The bull-headed design was produced until the 1930s and was also offered with a fish-head shape.

Rotating wheel can openers

The first rotating wheel can opener was patented in July 1870 by William Lyman of Meriden, Connecticut, US and produced by the firm Baumgarten in the 1890s. The can was to be pierced in its centre with the sharp metal rod of the opener. Then, the length of the lever had to be adjusted to fit the can size, and the lever fixed with the wingnut. The top of the can was cut by pressing the cutting wheel into the can near the edge and rotating it along the can's rim.

The necessity to pierce the can first was a nuisance, and this can opener design did not survive. In 1920, Edwin Anderson patented a can opener with pivoted handles with which to hold the can in one hand while a key-type handle geared to a cutting wheel is turned with the other cutting the outside of the lip, a side can opener, unlike the gramophone-like orientation of most contemporary can openers, in effect a hand-held pliers version of the Swanson Can-Opener. In 1925, the Star Can Opener Company of San Francisco, California, US had improved Lyman's design by adding a second, serrated wheel, called a "feed wheel", which allowed a firm grip of the can edge. This addition was so efficient that the design is still in use today.

Whereas all previous openers required using one hand or other means to hold the can, can-holding openers simultaneously grip the can and open it. The first such opener was patented in 1931 by the Bunker Clancey Company of Kansas City, Missouri and was, therefore, called the "Bunker". It featured the now standard pliers-type handles, when squeezed would tightly grip the can rim, while turning the key would rotate the cutting wheel, progressively cutting the lid along the rim.  The cutting wheel is coupled to a serrated feed wheel as in the Star design and rotated in the opposite direction by interlocking cogwheels reducing friction. The Bunker company was absorbed by the Rival Manufacturing Company, also of Kansas City, in 1938.

A new style of the can opener emerged in the 1980s. Whereas most other openers remove the lid by cutting down through the lid from the top just inside the rim, removing the top and leaving the rim attached to the can, these use a roller and cutting wheel to cut through the outside seam of the can. The can is left with a relatively safe, non-jagged edge, and the top can be set back on top as a cover, although it does not provide a seal. The feed wheel teeth have a somewhat finer pitch than those of earlier designs and reside at the bottom of a V-shaped groove, which surrounds the rim on three sides at the point of action.

Church key

Church key initially referred to a simple hand-operated device for prying the cap (called a "crown cork" or "bottle cap") off a glass bottle; this kind of closure was invented in 1892. The first of these church key style openers was patented in Canada in 1900.

The shape and design of some of these early "church key" opener's fulcrum hole resembled a large old key's dual-node keyring hole. In 1935, steel beer cans with flat tops appeared, and a device to pierce the lids was needed. The same opener was used for piercing those cans.  Made from a single piece of pressed metal, with a sharp point at one end, it was devised by D. F. Sampson, for the American Can Company, who depicted operating instructions on the cans. The church key opener is still being produced, sometimes as part of another opener. For example, a "butterfly" opener is often a combination of the church key and a serrated-wheel opener. Beer and soda cans began in the mid-1960s to feature pop-tabs, which were rings attached to cans. These tabs eliminated the need for church keys to open the cans.

Military use can openers

Several can openers with a simple and robust design have been specifically developed for military use. The P-38 and P-51 are small can openers with a cutter hinged to the main body. They were also known as a "John Wayne" because the actor was shown in a training film opening a can of K-rations. The P-38 can opener is keychain-sized, about 1.5 inches (38 mm) long, and consists of a short metal blade that serves as a handle (and can also be used as a screwdriver), with a small, hinged metal tooth that folds out to pierce the can lid. A notch just under the hinge point keeps the opener hooked around the rim of the can as the device is "walked" around the rim to cut the lid out. A larger version, called P-51, is somewhat easier to operate. P-38 was developed in 1942 and was issued in the canned field rations of the United States Armed Forces from World War II to the 1980s. The P-38 and P-51 are cheaper to manufacture and are smaller and lighter to carry than most other can openers. The device can be easily attached to a keyring or dog tag chain using the small punched hole.

Official military designations for the P-38 include "US Army pocket can opener" and "Opener, can, hand, folding, type I". As with some other military terms (e.g., jeep), the origin of the term is not known with certainty. The P-38 and P-51 openers share a designation with the Lockheed P-38 Lightning and North American P-51 Mustang fighters, however this is coincidental.

P-38s are no longer used for individual rations by the United States Armed Forces, as canned C-rations were replaced by soft-pack MREs in the 1980s. They are, however, included with United States military "Tray Rations" (canned bulk meals). They are also still seen in disaster recovery efforts and have been handed out alongside canned food by rescue organizations, both in America and abroad in Afghanistan. The original US-contract P-38 can openers were manufactured by J. W. Speaker Corp. (stamped "US Speaker") and by Washburn Corp. (marked "US Androck"), they were later made by Mallin Hardware (now defunct) of Shelby, Ohio and were variously stamped "US Mallin Shelby O." or "U.S. Shelby Co."

A similar device that incorporates a small spoon at one end and a bottle opener at the other is currently employed by the Australian Defence Force and New Zealand Army in its ration kits. The Field Ration Eating Device is known by the acronym "FRED". It is also known as the "Fucking Ridiculous Eating Device".

Another similar device was included with British Army "Operational Ration Pack, General Purpose" 24-hour ration pack and "Composite Ration Pack" rations. At one time they were manufactured by W. P. Warren Engineering Co., Ltd. The instructions printed on the miniature, greaseproof paper bag in which they were packed read: "Their design is similar, but not identical, to the P-38 and P-51 can openers."

Most military ration can openers have a very simple design and have also been produced for civilian use in many countries. For example, small folding openers similar to the P-38 and P-51 were designed in 1924 and were widely distributed in the Eastern European countries.

In Slovenia a somewhat rounded version of a P-38 is known as "sardine can opener", because in the 1990s such openers were usually packed with cans that did not feature the pull-top pre-scored lid. A non-folding version of the P-38 used to be very common in Israeli kitchens, and can still be found in stores, often sold in packs of five.

Electric openers

The first electric can opener was patented in 1931 and modeled after the rotating wheel can opener design. Those openers were produced in the 1930s and advertised as capable of removing lids from more than 20 cans per minute without risk of injury. Nevertheless, they found little success. Electric openers were re-introduced in 1956 by two American companies. Klassen Enterprises of Centreville brought out a wall-mounted electric model, but this complex design was unpopular too.

The same year, Walter Hess Bodle invented a freestanding device, combining an electric can opener and knife sharpener. He and his family members built their prototype in his garage, with daughter Elizabeth sculpting the body design. It was manufactured under the "Udico" brand of the Union Die Casting Co. in Los Angeles, California, US and was offered in Flamingo Pink, Avocado Green, and Aqua Blue, popular colors of the era. These openers were introduced to the market for Christmas sales and found immediate success.

Cans without openers

See also
 Assume a can opener

References

1855 introductions
Food preparation appliances
Kitchenware
Domestic implements
Food packaging
Articles containing video clips
19th-century inventions
British inventions